Lophodiodon calori, also known as the four-bar porcupinefish, is a species of porcupinefish native to the Indo-Pacific where it is found in environments with a substrate composed of rubble and sand at depths of at most , often above the continental shelf.  Although adults of the species are benthic in nature, juveniles are pelagic. It feeds on hard-shelled invertebrates and is noted to be an uncommon species. The species grows to a length of  SL and is the only known member of its genus.

References

Diodontidae
Monotypic marine fish genera
Taxa named by Alec Fraser-Brunner